G Gopinathan Pillai (1921-2002) was an Indian politician from Praja Socialist Party who represented Mavelikkara constituency from 1967 to 1977.

External links
MEMBERS OF THIRD KERALA LEGISLATIVE ASSEMBLY (1967 - 1969)
MEMBERS OF FOURTH KERALA LEGISLATIVE ASSEMBLY (1970 - 1977)
 GOPINATHAN PILLAI

Praja Socialist Party politicians
20th-century Indian politicians
1921 births
2002 deaths
People from Alappuzha district
Kerala MLAs 1967–1970
Kerala MLAs 1970–1977